Richtweg is a public transport station for the rapid transit trains of Hamburg's underground railway line U1, located in Norderstedt, Germany.

It was opened 1953 as a stop of the Alster Northern Railway (ANB) from Ulzburg Süd to Ochsenzoll with an island platform. Between 1994 and 1996 this section of the ANB was rebuilt for the Hamburg U-Bahn system.

Station layout 
The station is a side platform station with a passenger bridge crossing at the north and exits to both sides of it.

See also 
Hamburger Verkehrsverbund Public transport association in Hamburg
Hamburger Hochbahn Operator of the Hamburg U-Bahn

References

External links 

 Network plan HVV (pdf) 560 KiB 

U1 (Hamburg U-Bahn) stations
Norderstedt Richtweg
Norderstedt Richtweg
Norderstedt Richtweg
Norderstedt Richtweg